Seeds of Rage is the first work of Eldritch, released in 1995. This work is dedicated to the memory of Fabio and Roberto Cappanera.

Track listing
"Incurably Ill" - 6:45
"Under This Ground" - 5:00
"Chains" - 5:14
"Cage of Sins" - 4:55
"Colors" - 6:21
"The Deaf and the Blind" - 4:03
"Ultimate Solution" - 5:22
"I Don't Know Why" - 4:45
"Chalice of Insanity" - 3:41
"Blind Promise" - 5:19

1995 debut albums
Eldritch (band) albums